Oneness Pentecostalism (also known as Apostolic, Jesus' Name Pentecostalism, or the Jesus Only movement) is a nontrinitarian religious movement within the Protestant Christian family of churches known as Pentecostalism. It derives its distinctive name from its teaching on the Godhead, which is popularly referred to as the Oneness doctrine, a form of Modalistic Monarchianism. This doctrine states that there is one God, a singular divine spirit with no distinction of persons who manifests himself in many ways, including as Father, Son, and Holy Spirit. This stands in sharp contrast to the doctrine of three distinct and eternal persons posited by Trinitarian theology.

Oneness believers solely baptize in the name of Jesus Christ as opposed to the Trinitarian formula of baptizing "in the name of the Father, the Son, and the Holy Spirit." Oneness believers state that Jesus is the one name of the Father, Son, and Holy Spirit, and so all religious activities should be performed in that one name.

Besides their beliefs about the Godhead, Oneness Pentecostals differ significantly from most other Pentecostal and Evangelical Christians in matters of soteriology. Whereas most Pentecostals and Evangelical Protestants believe that only faith in Jesus Christ is the essential element for salvation, Oneness Pentecostals believe that salvation is by grace through faith, and that true faith leads to repentance, full-submersion water baptism in the name of Jesus Christ, and baptism in the Holy Spirit with the evidence of speaking in other tongues. Many also tend to emphasize strict holiness standards in dress, grooming and other areas of personal conduct, a teaching shared with traditional Holiness Pentecostals, but not with other Finished Work Pentecostal groups, at least not to the degree that is generally found in some Oneness Pentecostal (and Holiness Pentecostal) churches who also say holiness is to be set apart to God.

The Oneness Pentecostal movement first emerged in North America around 1914 as the result of a schism following the doctrinal disputes within the nascent Finished Work Pentecostal movement (which itself had broken from Holiness Pentecostalism)—specifically within the Assemblies of God—and claims an estimated 24 million adherents today. It was often pejoratively referred to as the Jesus Only movement in its early days, which may be misleading as they do not deny existence of the Father or Holy Spirit.

History

Background of Oneness theology
The first Pentecostals were Holiness Pentecostals, who teach three works of grace (the new birth, entire sanctification, and Spirit baptism accompanied by glossolalia); Finished Work Pentecostals broke off and became partitioned into Trinitarian and nontrinitarian branches, the latter being known as Oneness Pentecostalism.

The Oneness Pentecostal movement in North America is believed to have begun in 1913 as the result of doctrinal disputes within the nascent Pentecostal movement, specifically within the Assemblies of God, the first Finished Work Pentecostal denomination. In 1913, Canadian Pentecostal Robert T. McAlister preached at a Pentecostal camp meeting in Los Angeles that the "Jesus only" baptismal formula found in Acts 2:38 was to be preferred over the three-part formula "Father, Son, and Holy Ghost" found in Matthew 28:19, leading to a group to rebaptize themselves and form a new Pentecostal movement.

During these formative years, doctrinal division developed and widened over traditional Trinitarian theology and over the formula used at baptism, with some Pentecostal leaders claiming revelation or other insights pointing them toward the Oneness concept. Pentecostals quickly split along these doctrinal lines; those who held to belief in the Trinity and in the Trinitarian baptismal formula condemned the Oneness teaching as heresy. On the other hand, those who rejected the Trinity as being contrary to the Bible and as a form of polytheism (by dividing God into three separate beings, according to their interpretation) formed their own denominations and institutions, which ultimately developed into the Oneness churches of today.

Scholars within the movement differ in their views on church history. Some church historians, such as Dr. Curtis Ward, Marvin Arnold, and William Chalfant, hold to a Successionist view, arguing that their movement has existed in every generation from the original day of Pentecost to the present day. Ward has proposed a theory of an unbroken Pentecostal church lineage, claiming to have chronologically traced its perpetuity throughout the church's history. This view is supported by Michael Servetus' book in 1531 titled: De Trinitatis erroribus libri vii, which argued theological fallacies within the doctrine of the Trinity. Michael Servetus was later tried on thirty-eight articles drawn up by John Calvin, alleging blasphemy and heresy regarding the Trinity and infant baptism, and burned at the stake by the government of Geneva.

Others hold to a Restorationist view, believing that while the apostles and their church clearly taught Oneness doctrine and the Pentecostal experience, the early apostolic church went into apostasy and ultimately evolved into the Catholic Church. For them, the contemporary Oneness Pentecostal movement came into existence in America in the early 20th century during the latter days of the Azusa Street Revival. Restorationists such as Dr. David K. Bernard and Dr. David S. Norris deny any direct link between the church of the Apostolic Age and the current Oneness movement, believing that modern Oneness Pentecostalism is a total restoration originating from a step-by-step separation within Protestantism culminating in the final restoration of the early apostolic church.

Oneness views on the early church
Both Successionists and Restorationists among Oneness Pentecostals assert that the early apostolic church believed in the Oneness and Jesus name baptism doctrines. Oneness theologian David K. Bernard claims to trace Oneness adherents back to the first converted Jews of the Apostolic Age. He asserts that there is no evidence of these converts having any difficulty comprehending the Christian Church's teachings and integrating them with their existing strict Judaistic monotheistic beliefs; however in the post-Apostolic Age, Bernard claims that Hermas, Clement of Rome, Polycarp, Polycrates, Ignatius (who lived between 90 and 140 A.D.), and Irenaeus (who died about 200 A.D.) were either Oneness, modalist, or at most a follower of an "economic Trinity," that is, a temporary Trinity and not an eternal one. He also asserts that Trinitarianism's origin was pagan, quoting anti-Catholic Alexander Hislop, a Presbyterian minister; none of Hislop's arguments on Christian theology and history have been confirmed by historians in modern scholarship.

Bernard theorizes that the majority of all believers were Oneness adherents until the time of Tertullian, who he believes was the first prominent exponent of Trinitarianism (though Theophilus of Antioch was the first prominent figure, against this theory). In support of his allegation, Bernard quotes Tertullian as writing against Praxeas:
 In contrast to Bernard's theory, most scholars suggest the writings of Ignatius and Irenaeus suggest an eternal Trinity, though Oneness theologian Dr. David S. Norris disagrees with them in his book I AM: A Oneness Pentecostal Theology, writing, "While Ignatius can on occasion utilize the language of the Father, Son, and Holy Spirit, he does not have three persons in mind."

Beginnings of the Oneness movement
In April 1913, at the Apostolic Faith Worldwide Camp Meeting held in Arroyo Seco, California and conducted by Maria Woodworth-Etter, organizers promised that God would "deal with them, giving them a unity and power that we have not yet known." Canadian R. E. McAlister preached a message about water baptism just prior to a baptismal service that was about to be conducted. His message defended the "single immersion" method and preached "that apostolic baptism was administered as a single immersion in a single name, Jesus Christ," saying: "The words Father, Son, and Holy Ghost were never used in Christian baptism." This immediately caused controversy when Frank Denny, a Pentecostal missionary to China, jumped on the platform and tried to censor McAlister. Oneness Pentecostals mark this occasion as the initial "spark" in the Oneness revival movement.

John G. Schaepe, a young minister, was so moved by McAlister's  revelation, after praying and reading the Bible all night, he ran through the camp the following morning shouting that he'd received a revelation on baptism: that the name of the Father, Son, and Holy Spirit was "Lord Jesus Christ." Schaepe claimed during this camp-meeting that the name of the Father, Son, and Holy Ghost was the name of the "Lord Jesus Christ," which was later part of the baptismal command posited by Peter in Acts 2:38—i.e., baptism "in the name of Jesus Christ"—and was the fulfillment and counterpart of the Great Commission in Matthew 28:19 constituting baptism in the name (singular) of the Father and of the Son and of the Holy Spirit (which name Oneness believers hold to be that of Jesus). This conclusion was accepted by several others in the camp and given further theological development by a minister named Frank Ewart.

On April 15, 1914, Frank Ewart and Glenn Cook publicly baptized each other specifically in "the name of the Lord Jesus Christ" (and not the Trinitarian formula) in a tank set up in Ewart's Crusade tent. This is considered to be the historical point when Oneness Pentecostalism emerged as a distinct movement. A number of ministers claimed they were baptized "in the Name of Jesus Christ" before 1914, including Frank Small and Andrew D. Urshan. Urshan claims to have baptized others in Jesus Christ's name as early as 1910. In addition, Charles Parham, the founder of the modern Pentecostal movement, was recorded baptizing using a Christological formula during the Azusa Street revival.

However, it was not the Oneness baptismal formula which proved the divisive issue between Oneness advocates and other Pentecostals, but rather their rejection of the Trinity. In the Assemblies of God, the re-baptisms in Jesus' name caused a backlash from many Trinitarians in that organization, who feared the direction that their church might be heading toward. J. Roswell Flower initiated a resolution on the subject, which caused many Oneness baptizers to withdraw from the organization. In October 1916 at the Fourth General Council of the Assemblies of God, the issue finally came to a head. The mostly-Trinitarian leadership, fearing that the new issue of Oneness might overtake their organization, drew up a doctrinal statement affirming the truth of Trinitarian dogma, among other issues. When the Assemblies of God Statement of Fundamental Truths was adopted, a third of the fellowship's ministers left to form Oneness fellowships. After this separation, most Oneness believers became relatively isolated from other Pentecostals.

Forming Oneness organizations

Having separated themselves from the Trinitarians within the new Pentecostal movement, Oneness Pentecostals felt a need to come together and form an association of churches of "like precious faith." This led to the formation of the General Assembly of the Apostolic Assemblies in Eureka Springs, Arkansas in January 1917, which merged with a second Oneness body by 1918, the Pentecostal Assemblies of the World.

Several small Oneness ministerial groups formed after 1914. Many of these were ultimately merged into the Pentecostal Assemblies of the World, while others remained independent, like AFM Church of God. Divisions occurred within the Pentecostal Assemblies of the World over the role of women in ministry, usage of wine or grape juice for communion, divorce and remarriage, and the proper mode of water baptism. There were also reports of racial tension in the organization. African Americans were joining the church in great numbers, and many held significant leadership positions. In particular, the African American pastor G. T. Haywood served as the church's general secretary, and signed all ministerial credentials. In 1925, three new organizations were formed: the Apostolic Churches of Jesus Christ, Emmanuel's Church in Jesus Christ and the Pentecostal Ministerial Alliance. The first two later merged to become the Apostolic Church of Jesus Christ.

In 1945 a merger of two predominantly-white Oneness groups, the Pentecostal Church, Inc. and the Pentecostal Assemblies of Jesus Christ, resulted in the formation of the United Pentecostal Church International, or UPCI. Beginning with 521 churches, it has become the largest and most influential Oneness Pentecostal organization through its evangelism and publishing efforts, reporting a membership of 5.5 million.

Oneness doctrine of God
Oneness Pentecostalism has a historical precedent in the Modalistic Monarchianism of the fourth century. This earlier movement affirmed the two central aspects of Oneness belief:
There is one indivisible God with no distinction of persons in God's eternal essence, and
Jesus Christ is the manifestation, human personification, or incarnation of the one God.

They contend that, based on Colossians 2:9, the concept of God's personhood is reserved for the immanent and incarnate presence of Jesus only.

Characteristics of God
Oneness theology specifically maintains that God is a singular spirit who is absolutely and indivisibly one (not three persons, individuals, or minds). They contend that the terms "Father," "Son," and "Holy Ghost" (also known as the Holy Spirit) are merely titles reflecting the different personal manifestations of God in the universe. When Oneness believers speak of the Father, the Son, and the Holy Spirit, they see these as three personal manifestations of one being, one personal God.

Oneness teachers often quote a phrase used by early pioneers of the movement: "God was manifested as the Father in creation, the Son in redemption, and the Holy Ghost in emanation," though Oneness theologian Dr. David Norris points out that this does not mean that Oneness Pentecostal believe that God can only be one of those manifestations at a time, which may be suggested in the quote.

According to Oneness theology, the Father and the Holy Spirit are one and the same personal God. They teach that the term "Holy Spirit" is a descriptive title for God manifesting himself through the Christian Church and in the world. These two titles (as well as others) do not reflect separate persons within the Godhead, but rather two different ways in which the one God reveals himself to his creatures. Rather, "The Lord" indicates God in all of his glory and transcendence, while "his Spirit" refers to his own Spirit that moved upon and spoke to prophets. Oneness theologians teach that this passage does not imply two persons any more than the numerous scriptural references to a man and his spirit or soul (such as in ) imply two "persons" existing within one body.

The ambiguity of the term "person" has been noted by both Oneness and Trinitarian proponents as a source of conflict. This issue is addressed by Trinitarian scholar and Christian apologist Alister McGrath:

In contrast, Oneness theologian Dr. David K. Bernard asserts that it is unbiblical to describe God as a plurality of persons in any sense of the word, "regardless of what persons meant in ancient church history."

Son of God
According to Oneness theology, the Son of God did not exist (in any substantial sense) prior to the incarnation of Jesus of Nazareth except as the Logos (or Word) of God the Father. They believe that humanity of Jesus did not exist before the incarnation, although Jesus (i.e. the Spirit of Jesus) pre-existed in his deity as the eternal God. This belief is supported by the lack of Jesus' incarnate presence anywhere in the Old Testament.

Oneness Pentecostals believe that the title "Son" only applied to Christ when he became flesh on earth, but that Christ was the Logos or Mind of the Father prior to his being made human, and not a separate person. In this theology, the Father embodies the divine attributes of the Godhead and the Son embodies the human aspects. They believe that Jesus and the Father are one essential person, though operating as different modes.

Oneness author W. L. Vincent writes, "The argument against the 'Son being his own Father' is a red herring. It should be evident that Oneness theology acknowledges a clear distinction between the Father and Son–in fact this has never been disputed by any Christological view that I am aware of."

The Word
Oneness theology holds that "the Word" in John 1:1 was the mind or plan of God. Oneness Pentecostals believe that the Word was not a separate person from God but that it was the plan of God and was God Himself. Dr. David K. Bernard writes in his book The Oneness View of Jesus Christ, 

Additionally, Bernard claims that the Greek word pros (translated “with” in John 1:1) could also be translated as “pertaining to,” meaning that John 1:1 could also be translated as (in his view), “The Word pertained to God and the Word was God.”

In the incarnation, Oneness believers hold that God put the Word (which was His divine plan) into action by manifesting Himself in the form of the man Jesus, and thus "the Word became flesh". In this, Oneness believers say that the incarnation was a singular event, unlike anything God had done prior or will ever do again. Oneness Pentecostals believe that the Word of John 1:1 does not imply a second pre-existent, divine person, but that the Word is simply the plan of God, which was put into action through the incarnation.

The Dual Nature of Christ

When discussing the Incarnation, Oneness theologians and authors often refer to a concept known as the "dual nature" of Christ, which is understood as the union of human and divine natures in the man Christ Jesus. Dr. Bernard describes this concept in his book The Oneness of God, stating that Jesus "is both Spirit and flesh, God and man, Father and Son. On his human side He is the Son of man; on his divine side He is the Son of God and is the Father dwelling in the flesh." They see this not as two persons in one body but rather as two natures united in one person: Jesus Christ. Oneness believers see the "mystery" of 1 Timothy 3:16 as referring to this concept of two natures being united in the one person of Jesus Christ.

Although the Oneness belief in the union of the divine and human into one person in Christ is similar to the Chalcedonian formula, Chalcedonians disagree sharply with them over their opposition to Trinitarian dogma. Chalcedonians see Jesus Christ as a single person uniting God the Son, the eternal second person of the traditional Trinity, with human nature. Oneness believers, on the other hand, see Jesus as one single person uniting the one God himself with human nature as the Son of God.

Scripture
Oneness Pentecostalism subscribes to the doctrine of Sola Scriptura in common with mainstream Pentecostals. They view the Bible as the inspired Word of God, and as absolutely inerrant in its contents (though not necessarily in every translation). They specifically reject the conclusions of church councils such as the Council of Nicaea and the Nicene Creed. They believe that mainstream Trinitarian Christians have been misled by long-held and unchallenged "traditions of men."

The name of Jesus
The overwhelming emphasis on the person of Jesus shapes the content of a theology based on experience among both Oneness and Trinitarian Pentecostals. In principle, the doctrinal emphasis on Jesus attributes all divine qualities and functions to Christ. What might therefore be called a 'Christological maximalism' in the Pentecostal doctrine of God leads among Oneness Pentecostals to a factual substitution of the three divine persons with the single person of Jesus, while Trinitarian Pentecostals typically elevate Christ from the 'second' person of the Trinity to the central figure of Christian faith and worship.

Critics of Oneness theology commonly refer to its adherents as "Jesus Only," implying that they deny the existence of the Father and Holy Spirit. Most Oneness Pentecostals consider that term to be pejorative, and a misrepresentation of their true beliefs on the issue. Oneness believers insist that while they do indeed believe in baptism only in the name of Jesus Christ, citing Acts 2:38, Acts 8:12; 8:16, Acts 10:48, and Acts 19:15 as opposed to the traditional Trinitarian baptism; to describe them as "Jesus Only Pentecostals" implies a denial of the Father and Holy Spirit.

View of the Trinity
Oneness Pentecostals believe that the Trinitarian doctrine is a "tradition of men" and is neither scriptural nor a teaching of God, citing the absence of the word "Trinity" from the Bible as one evidence of this. They—alongside the nontrinitarian Jehovah's Witnesses—generally believe the doctrine was gradually developed over the first four centuries AD, culminating with the Council of Nicaea and later councils which made the doctrine as believed today orthodox; most mainstream Christian scholars have rejected these assertions and some have rebutted alleged misinterpretations of Trinitarians seeming to support those assertions. Oneness Pentecostals insist that their conception of the Godhead is true to early Christianity's allegedly strict monotheism, contrasting their views not only with Trinitarianism, but equally with the theology espoused by the Latter-day Saints (who believe that Christ was a separate god from the Father and the Spirit) and Jehovah's Witnesses (who see him as the first-begotten Son of God, and as a subordinate deity to the Father). Oneness theology is similar to historical Modalism or Sabellianism, although it cannot be exactly characterized as such.

The Oneness position as nontrinitarians places them at odds with the members of most Christian denominations, some of whom have accused Oneness Pentecostals of being Modalists and derided them as cultists. Oneness clergy consecrated into the Joint College of Bishops are also at odds on grounds of their claims to apostolic succession (being that documented consecrators in succession were Trinitarian from the Roman Catholic, Anglican, and Eastern churches, alongside contradicting records).

Accusations of Modalism and Arianism 
Oneness believers are often accused of being Monistic or Modalistic. They have also occasionally been accused of Arianism or Semi-Arianism, usually by isolated individuals rather than church organizations. While Oneness theologian Dr. David K. Bernard indicates that Modalistic Monarchianism and Oneness are essentially the same, and that Sabellius was basically correct (so long as one does not understand Modalism to be the same as patripassianism), and while Arius also believed that God is a singular person, Bernard vehemently denies any connection to Arianism or Subordinationism in Oneness teaching.

Oneness soteriology
Oneness theology does not represent a monolithic soteriological view; however, there are general characteristics that tend to be held in common by those who hold to a Oneness-view of God. In common with most Protestant denominations, Oneness Pentecostal soteriology maintains that all people are born with a sinful nature, and sin at a young age, and remain lost without hope of salvation unless they embrace the Gospel; that Jesus Christ made a complete atonement for the sins of all people, which is the sole means of man's redemption; and that salvation comes solely by grace through faith in Jesus Christ. Oneness doctrine also teaches that true faith has the fruit of obedience, and that true salvation is not only to profess faith, but to demonstrate it as well in action. Oneness churches, while exhibiting variations, generally teach the following as the foundation of Christian conversion:
 repentance;
 water baptism in the name of Jesus Christ (Acts 2:38; Acts 10:48);
 baptism in the Holy Spirit with the evidence of speaking in tongues.

Oneness Pentecostals generally accept that these are the minimal requirements of conversion.

Grace and faith
Oneness Pentecostals maintain that no good works or obedience to law can save anyone, apart from God's grace. Furthermore, salvation comes solely through faith in Jesus Christ; there is no salvation through any name or work other than his (Acts 4:12). Oneness teaching rejects interpretations that hold that salvation is given automatically to the elect; they believe that all men are called to salvation, and "whosoever will, may come" (Revelation 22:17).

While salvation is indeed a gift in Oneness belief, it must be received. This reception of salvation is generally what is considered conversion, and is accepted in the majority of evangelical Protestant churches. The first mandate is true faith in Jesus Christ, demonstrated by obedience to God's commands, and a determination to submit to his will in every aspect of one's life. Oneness adherents reject the notion that one may be saved through what they call mental faith: mere belief in Christ, without life-changing repentance or obedience. Thus, they emphatically reject the idea that one is saved through praying the sinner's prayer, but rather the true saving faith and change of life declared in scripture. Oneness Pentecostals have no issue with the prayer itself, but deny that it alone represents saving faith, believing the Bible accordingly mandates repentance, baptism by water and spirit with receipt of the Holy Spirit as a manifestation of the spirit part of the rebirth experience and the true, godly faith obeyed and done by the early Church believers. Thus, one who has truly been saved will gladly submit to the biblical conditions for conversion. According to these believers, Jesus and the apostles taught that the new birth experience includes repentance (the true Sinner's Prayer), and baptism in both water and God's Spirit.

Repentance
Oneness Pentecostals maintain that salvation is not possible without repentance. While repentance is in part godly sorrow for sin, it is as much as complete change of heart and mind toward God and his word. This is why Oneness churches expect a complete reformation of life in those who have become Christians.

Water baptism
Most Oneness Pentecostals believe that water baptism is essential to salvation and not merely symbolic in nature, and also believe that one must have faith and repent before being baptized, therefore deeming baptisms of infants or by compulsion unacceptable. Oneness Pentecostal theology maintains the literal definition of baptism as being completely immersed in water. They believe that other modes either have no biblical basis or are based upon inexact Old Testament rituals, and that their mode is the only one described in the New Testament. The articles of faith of the largest Oneness Pentecostal religious organization states, "The scriptural mode of baptism is immersion and is only for those who have fully repented... It should be administered... in the name of our Lord Jesus Christ, according to the Acts of the Apostles 2:38, 8:16, 10:48, 19:5; thus obeying Matthew 28:19."

Baptismal formula

Oneness adherents believe that for water baptism to be valid, one must be baptized "in the name of Jesus Christ," rather than the Trinitarian baptismal formula "in the name of the Father, and of the Son, and of the Holy Spirit." This is referred to as the Jesus' Name doctrine. "Jesus' Name" is a description used to refer to Oneness Pentecostals and their baptismal beliefs.

This conviction is mainly centered around the baptismal formula mandated in Acts 2:38: "Repent, and be baptized every one of you in the name of Jesus Christ for the remission of sins; and ye shall receive the gift of the Holy Ghost." Oneness Pentecostals insist that there are no New Testament references to baptism by any other formula–save in Matthew 28:19, which most hold to be simply another reference to baptism in the name of Jesus. Although Matthew 28:19 seems to mandate a Trinitarian formula for baptism, Oneness theology avows that since the word "name" in the verse is singular, it must refer to Jesus, whose name they believe to be that of the Father, Son, and Holy Spirit. Oneness believers insist that all Bible's texts on the subject must be in full agreement with each other; thus, they say that either the apostles disobeyed the command they had been given in Matthew 28:19 or they correctly fulfilled it by using the name of Jesus Christ.

Some Oneness believers consider that the text of Matthew 28:19 is not original, quoting various scholars and the early Church historian Eusebius, who referred to this passage at least eighteen times in his works. Eusebius' text reads: "go and make disciples of all nations in my name, teaching them to observe all things whatsoever I commanded you." However, most Oneness believers accept the full Matthew 28:19 as an authentic part of the original text.

Oneness Pentecostals assert that all of the five mentions of baptism in the Book of Acts were performed in the name of Jesus (Acts 2:38; Acts 8:16; Acts 10:48; ; and Acts 22:16), and that no Trinitarian formula is ever referred to therein. In addition,  is taken by Oneness Pentecostals to indicate baptism in Jesus' name as well; Oneness author William Arnold III explains their reasoning: "If we follow Paul’s train of thought, his obvious implication is 'No, Christ was the one crucified for you and so you were baptized in the name of Christ.' So the believers at Corinth as well as those in Rome were baptized in Jesus’ name." Hence, Oneness believers claim that this constitutes proof that the Jesus name formula was the original one and that the Trinitarian invocation was erroneously substituted for it later. As additional support for their claim, Oneness Pentecostals also cite editions of Britannica, the Catholic Encyclopedia, Interpreter's Bible and various scholars to justify this claim; David Norris writes that "there is a strong scholarly consensus that the earliest Christian baptism was practiced in Jesus' name."

In contrast, the Didache—a Jewish Christian text generally dated to the first century AD—cites the Trinitarian formula. In response, some Oneness Pentecostals deride the text and support the now less-common assertion of it being a second century text; they also consider it untrustworthy citing one manuscript existing, though a Latin manuscript was discovered in 1900.

Mainstream (or Nicene/Trinitarian) Christians exegete "in the name of Jesus Christ" as by the "authority of Jesus" which denotes baptism in the name of the three persons of the Trinity. In response, Oneness Pentecostals claim that the wording of Acts 22:16 requires an oral invocation of the name of Jesus during baptism, and that the way one exercises the authority of Jesus is by using His name (pointing to the healing of the lame man at the Gate Beautiful in Acts 3 as an example of this, and referencing Jesus as the one name of God revealed).

Baptism of the Holy Spirit

Oneness Pentecostals believe that the Baptism of the Holy Spirit is a free gift, commanded for all. The Holy Spirit is defined in Pentecostal doctrine as the Spirit of God (also known as the Spirit of Christ) dwelling within a person. It is further explained as the power of God to edify them, help them abstain from sin, and anoint them with power to exercise the Gifts of the Spirit for edification of the church by the Will of God. This differs substantially from the incarnation of God as Jesus Christ, for the Incarnation involved "the fullness of the Godhead" uniting with human flesh, inseparably linking the deity and man to create the person of Jesus Christ. Believers, on the other hand are not permanently bonded with God as Jesus was, nor can any believer ever become as Jesus is by nature: God and man.

The Pentecostal doctrine of the indwelling of the Holy Spirit is most simply explained as God:

dwelling within an individual;
communing with an individual;
working through that individual.

Oneness doctrine maintains the Holy Spirit is the title of the one God in action, hence they maintain that the Holy Spirit within any individual is nothing more or less than God himself acting through that individual.

Pentecostals, both Oneness and Trinitarian, maintain that the Holy Spirit experience denotes the genuine Christian Church, and that he carries with him power for the believer to accomplish God's will. As do most Pentecostals, Oneness believers maintain that the initial sign of the infilling Holy Spirit is speaking in tongues, and that the New Testament mandates this as a minimal requirement. They equally recognize that speaking in tongues is a sign to unbelievers of the Holy Spirit's power, and is to be actively sought after and utilized, most especially in prayer. Oneness adherents assert that receipt of the Holy Spirit, manifested by speaking in tongues, is necessary for salvation.

Practices

Worship
In common with other Pentecostals, Oneness believers are known for their charismatic style of worship. They believe that the spiritual gifts found in the New Testament are still active in the church; hence, services are often spontaneous, being punctuated at times with acts of speaking in tongues, interpretation of tongues, prophetic messages, and the laying on of hands for the purposes of healing. Oneness believers, like all Pentecostals, are characterized by their practice of speaking in other tongues. In such ecstatic experiences a Oneness believer may vocalize fluent unintelligible utterances (glossolalia), or articulate a natural language previously unknown to them (xenoglossy).

Some Oneness Pentecostals practice foot washing, often in conjunction with their celebration of Holy Communion, as Jesus Christ did with his disciples at the Last Supper.

Holiness standards
Oneness Pentecostals believe that a Christian's lifestyle should be characterized by holiness. This holiness begins at baptism, when the blood of Christ washes away all sin and a person stands before God truly holy for the first time in his or her life. After this, a separation from the world in both practical and moral areas is essential to spiritual life. Moral or inward holiness consists of righteous living, guided and powered by the indwelling of the Holy Spirit. Practical or outward holiness for many Oneness believers involves certain holiness standards that dictate, among other things, modest apparel and gender distinction. Oneness Pentecostals believe wholeheartedly in dressing modestly (with restraints and limits). They believe that there is a distinct deference in modesty (being aware of one's limitations, or shunning indecency) and moderation (avoiding excesses or extremes while suggesting more than usual). Modesty carries the connotation of something being off-limits. They justify this belief by using the Biblical scripture in  "In like manner also, that women adorn themselves in modest apparel ..." Some Oneness organizations, considering current social trends in fashion and dress to be immoral, have established dress codes for their members. These guidelines are similar to those used by all Pentecostal denominations for much of the first half of the 20th century. According to UPCI standards written in the late-1990s, women are generally expected not to wear pants, make-up, form fitting clothing, jewelry, or to cut their hair; while men are expected to be clean-shaven, short-haired, and are expected to wear long sleeve shirts (women are also expected to wear long sleeve dresses or blouses) and long-legged pants, as opposed to shorts. Additionally, some Oneness organizations strongly admonish their members not to watch secular movies or television. Many of these standards have roots in the larger Holiness movement. However, the precise degree to which these standards are enforced varies from church to church and even from individual to individual within the movement. However, in the early days of the Oneness movement standards, holiness was not a held belief nor required bylaw for congregants. In fact, holiness or sanctification was actually shared with that of the Wesleyan viewpoint.

Due to the comparative strictness of their standards, Oneness Pentecostals are often accused of legalism by other Christians. Oneness denominations respond by saying that holiness is commanded by God and that it follows salvation, rather than causes it. For Oneness Pentecostals, holiness proceeds from love rather than duty, and is motivated by the holy nature imparted by the indwelling of the Holy Spirit. While the Christian life is indeed one of liberty from rules and laws, that liberty does not negate one's responsibility to follow scriptural teachings on moral issues, many of which were established by the apostles themselves.

Notable adherents

David K. Bernard – minister, theologian, general superintendent of the United Pentecostal Church International, and founding president of Urshan College and Urshan Graduate School of Theology
Irvin Baxter Jr. – minister, founder and president of Endtime Ministries, seen on various Christian television channels
Kim Davis – clerk of Rowan County, Kentucky who gained national media attention after defying a federal court order requiring that she issue same-sex marriage licenses following the U.S. Supreme Court decision in Obergefell v. Hodges
Garfield Thomas Haywood – first presiding bishop of the Pentecostal Assemblies of the World (1925–31); also the author of many tracts and composer of many gospel songs
Bishop Robert C. Lawson – protege of Bishop G. T. Haywood and founder of the Church of Our Lord Jesus Christ of the Apostolic Faith from 1919 to his death in 1961
Bishop Sherrod C. Johnson – founder and chief apostle of the Church of the Lord Jesus Christ of the Apostolic Faith
Hailemariam Desalegn – former Prime Minister of Ethiopia 
Tommy Tenney – a minister and best-selling author
Bishop Jesse Delano Ellis II – first presiding prelate of the United Pentecostal Churches of Christ and Pentecostal Churches of Christ; founder of the Joint College of Bishops

See also
 Global Alliance of Affirming Apostolic Pentecostals
 Apostolic School of Theology
 Second blessing
 William M. Branham
 United Pentecostal Church International
 Jesus Miracle Crusade International Ministry
 List of Oneness Pentecostal denominations

References

Further reading

Christian fundamentalism
Nontrinitarian denominations
 
Nature of Jesus Christ